Cualedro is a municipality located in the province of Ourense in the Galicia region of north-west Spain.  Its population was 1,792 in 2016 in an area of 117.6 km.  The elevation is 843 meters.

References  

Municipalities in the Province of Ourense